Raymond "Ray" Wilson (born 12 March 1947 in Merton, Surrey, England) is a former international speedway rider who was World Pairs Champion in 1972 and British Speedway Champion in 1973, was also England Team Captain for five years in the early 1970s. He was the first Englishman to record a maximum score in a World Team Cup Final. His father Ron Wilson, was also a speedway rider for Leicester and Oxford in the early 1950s.

Domestic career 
Wilson competed in cycle speedway for Leicester Monarchs before following his father into a career in motorcycle speedway. He first rode at Leicester Stadium in 1962 after a league meeting and after occasional visits to the training track at Rye House and further second-half rides at Long Eaton in 1963, made his competitive debut in 1963 for Long Eaton Archers, coming in as an emergency replacement against Stoke Potters. He was included in the Archers team in 1964, although the season was interrupted by a broken leg. In 1965, he rode with the Archers in the new British League, and in 1966 he rode in every league match for the Archers, finishing the season with an average of 8.6. He then raced in Australia over the Winter and in 1967 his performances improved again, averaging 10.36 per match. He also reached the British Final, scoring ten points and qualifying for the World Final, where he finished in eighth place.

He followed the Long Eaton promotion when they moved to Leicester to open the Leicester Lions. He stayed with the Lions for nine seasons, scoring over four thousand points (including bonus points). For the final three seasons of his career he joined the Birmingham Brummies.

Outside speedway, Wilson ran his own haulage company.

He is currently enjoying the role of Ambassador to his home town team, Leicester.

International career
Wilson first rode for England in 1966 against Scotland, and in 1967 rode in test matches against Sweden and Poland. He was part of England's line-up for the 1967 World Team Cup, becoming the youngest Englishman to feature in a World Team Cup final at aged twenty,  and was part of the England team that toured Australia in 1967/8.

1967 also saw him appear in his first of four World Championship finals. In 1972 he became World Pairs Champion with partner Terry Betts.

He captained Great Britain when they won the World Team Cup in 1973, and was also a member of the winning teams in 1971, 1972 and 1974 (the latter for England). His maximum score in 1971 led to him gaining the nickname "World Cup Willy".

World Final appearances

Individual World Championship
 1967 -  London, Wembley Stadium - 8th - 7pts
 1971 -  Göteborg, Ullevi - 4th - 11pts
 1973 -  Chorzów, Silesian Stadium - 14th - 5pts
 1975 -  London, Wembley Stadium - 11th - 5pts

World Pairs Championship
 1968* -  Kempten (with Geoff Mudge) - 2nd - 21pts (9)
 1972 -  Borås (with Terry Betts) - Winner - 24pts (15+3)
* Unofficial World Championships.

World Team Cup
 1967* -  Malmö, Malmö Stadion (with Eric Boocock / Barry Briggs / Ivan Mauger / Colin Pratt) - 3rd= - 19pts (4)
 1970* -  London, Wembley Stadium  (with Ivan Mauger / Barry Briggs / Nigel Boocock / Eric Boocock) - 2nd - 31pts (4)
 1971* -  Wroclaw, Olympic Stadium (with Jim Airey / Ivan Mauger / Barry Briggs / Ronnie Moore) - Winner - 37pts (12)
 1972* -  Olching, Olching Speedwaybahn (with Ivan Mauger / Terry Betts / John Louis) - Winner - 36pts (8)
 1973* -  London, Wembley Stadium (with Malcolm Simmons / Peter Collins / Terry Betts) – Winner – 37pts (8)
 1974 -  Chorzów, Silesian Stadium (with Peter Collins / John Louis / Dave Jessup / Malcolm Simmons) - Winner - 42pts (dnr)
* 1967-1973 for Great Britain. All others for England.

References

External links
Leicester Speedway
Leicester Speedway News & History

1947 births
Living people
British speedway riders
English motorcycle racers
Speedway World Pairs Champions
British Speedway Championship winners
Birmingham Brummies riders
Leicester Lions riders
Long Eaton Archers riders